Aceratium ferrugineum is a species of medium-sized trees, commonly known as rusty carabeen, constituting part of the plant family Elaeocarpaceae. They are endemic to the Wet Tropics rainforests of northeastern Queensland, Australia.

Within the Wet Tropics region rusty carabeen trees grow only in the restricted areas of luxuriant, mature, mountain rainforest on the Mount Carbine Tableland between Black Mountain and Mt Spurgeon, and on Mt Lewis. There they grow on soils built from granite parent materials.

Description
The leaves occur opposite each other, when new have dense rusty hairs all over them which persist on the underside and the top midrib, and measure . Their fibrous ripe flesh smells like ripe watermelon.

Although not yet well known, the trees have some popularity in cultivation, for example in Brisbane.

References

Elaeocarpaceae
Flora of Queensland